Machilipatnam revenue division (or Machilipatnam division) is an administrative division in the Krishna district of the Indian state of Andhra Pradesh. It is one of the 3 revenue divisions in the district with 11 mandals under its administration. Machilipatnam serves as the headquarters of the division. The division has 2 municipalities namely, Machilipatnam and Pedana.

Mandals 
The mandals in the division are Avanigadda, Bantumilli, Challapalli, Guduru, Koduru, Kruthivennu, Machilipatnam, Mopidevi, Nagayalanka, Pedana, Ghantasala.

See also 
List of revenue divisions in Andhra Pradesh
Vijayawada revenue division

References 

Revenue divisions in Krishna district